Harry Blamires (6 November 1916 – 21 November 2017) was an English Anglican theologian, literary critic, and novelist. Blamires was once head of the English department at King Alfred's College (now University of Winchester) in Winchester, England. He started writing in the late 1940s at the encouragement of his friend and mentor C. S. Lewis, who had been his tutor at Oxford University, where he graduated from University College. 

Blamires married Nancy Bowles in 1940, and they had five sons. He turned 100 in November 2016.

His best known works are The Christian Mind: How Should a Christian Think? and The Bloomsday Book. The Bloomsday Book is a guide to James Joyce's Ulysses. It was first published in 1966 and revised in 1988 and 1996 (The New Bloomsday Book); it continues to help readers of Joyce's best-known work to this day. The Christian Mind has been used as a textbook at hundreds of bible colleges and seminaries around the world. Blamires was also the author of A Short History of English Literature (1974; 2nd edition, 1984), A History of Literary Criticism (1991) and four books on the use of English including The Penguin Guide To Plain English (2000).

Blamires died in November 2017 at the age of 101.

Works
The Devil's Hunting Grounds (1954, 1st novel of trilogy)
Cold War in Hell (1955, 2nd novel of trilogy)
Blessing Unbounded: A Vision (1955, 3rd novel of trilogy)
Highway to Heaven  (1955, 3rd novel of trilogy)
The Faith and Modern Error (1956) London: S.P.C.K.
The Christian Mind (1963) London: S.P.C.K.; New York: Seabury Press. Reprint. Ann Arbor, MI: Servant Books, 1978 ; Vancouver, B.C.: Regent College Publishing, 2005. 
A Defense of Dogmatism (1965) London: S.P.C.K. American edition, The Tyranny of Time: A Defence of Dogmatism New York: Morehouse-Barlow.
Where Do We Stand (1980) London: S.P.C.K.; Ann Arbor, MI: Servant Books ; Reprint. Vancouver, B.C.: Regent College Publishing, 2006. 
The Post-Christian Mind
On Christian Truth (1983) Ann Arbor, MI: Servant Books  Reprint. Vancouver, B.C.: Regent College Publishing, 2005. 
The Bloomsday Book (A guide through Joyce's Ulysses) 
Word Unheard (A guide through Eliot's Four Quartets) (1969) London: Methuen; Reprint. London: Routledge, 2015.
Milton's Creation (A guide through Milton's Paradise Lost) (1971)
The Will and the Way (A Study of Divine Providence and Vocation) (1957) London: S.P.C.K.

Recovering the Christian Mind: Meeting the Challenge of Secularism (1988)
The Queen's English (1995)
The Penguin Guide To Plain English (2000)
A Short History Of English Literature (1974, 1984)
Twentieth-Century English Literature (1982)
A History Of Literary Criticism (1991)
New Town - A Fable, Unless You Believe (2005)

References

External links

1916 births
2017 deaths
Anglican writers
English centenarians
English Christian theologians
English fantasy writers
English literary critics
Men centenarians
Writers from Yorkshire